Wu "Tony" Chung-yi is a Taiwanese billionaire who is the chairman of auto parts firm Fine Blanking. A large portion of his wealth comes from his sale of his former stake in Master Kong. He resides in Taichung, and attended UCLA.

In 2011, Wu was ranked #37 on the Forbes' list of richest Taiwanese people. By 2020, his rank had fallen to #41.

References

Living people
Taiwanese billionaires
University of California, Los Angeles alumni
Taiwanese expatriates in the United States
20th-century Taiwanese businesspeople
21st-century Taiwanese businesspeople
Businesspeople from Taichung
Taiwanese business executives
1950s births